Trendelenburg could refer to:

Friedrich Adolf Trendelenburg (1802–1872), German philosopher and philologist
His son, Friedrich Trendelenburg (1844–1924), German surgeon
Trendelenburg gait
Trendelenburg position
Trendelenburg test
Trendelenburg's sign
Trendelenburg's operation - great saphenous vein ligation as a treatment of varicose veins.